Dally Cyrille Innocent Gbale (born 1 January 1987 in Abidjan) is an Ivorian professional footballer who plays as a forward.

References

External links

1987 births
Living people
Footballers from Abidjan
Ivorian footballers
Association football forwards
Liga Portugal 2 players
Segunda Divisão players
S.C. Beira-Mar players
C.D. Aves players
C.D. Tondela players
S.C. Freamunde players
Football League (Greece) players
Trikala F.C. players
Ivorian expatriate footballers
Expatriate footballers in Portugal
Expatriate footballers in Greece
Expatriate footballers in Luxembourg
Ivorian expatriate sportspeople in Portugal
Ivorian expatriate sportspeople in Greece